Paula Stevens may refer to:

Paula Stevens, character in Allez Oop
Paula Stevens, see List of Sunset Beach characters